The Trofeo Bonfiglio ("Bonfiglio Trophy"), also known as the Campionati Internazionali d'Italia Juniores ("International Junior Championships of Italy"), is a prestigious junior tennis tournament held on outdoor red clay courts in Milan, Italy. It is one of five Grade A tournaments, the junior equivalent of ATP Masters or WTA Premier Mandatory events in terms of rankings points allocated. The tournament is contested in late May right before the French Open.

History
The Trofeo Bonfiglio has been classified as a Grade A tournament since 1978. Together with the Orange Bowl, it is one of the two oldest Grade A events to feature both boys' and girls' competitions. The tournament began in 1959 to honor Antonio Bonfiglio, a promising Italian junior player from Milan who died at age 19 due to pneumonia. Several winners of the tournament have gone on to win grand slam singles titles, including Ivan Lendl, Jim Courier, Goran Ivanišević, and Yevgeny Kafelnikov among the boys' champions, as well as Virginia Wade, Chris O'Neil, Gabriela Sabatini, and Sloane Stephens among the girls' champions.

Singles champions

Doubles champions

References

External links
 
 List of champions

Junior tennis
Recurring sporting events established in 1959
Tennis tournaments in Italy
Clay court tennis tournaments